Tianming may refer to:

Mandate of Heaven (天命), traditional Chinese philosophical concept concerning the legitimacy of rulers
Tianming, Shaanxi (天明), a town in Chenggu County, Shaanxi, China

Historical eras
Tianming (天明; 623–624), era name used by Fu Gongshi, self-proclaimed emperor of Song during the Sui–Tang transition
Tianming (天命; 1616–1627), era name used by Nurhaci, Manchu chieftain and khan of the Later Jin

Film and TV
Daybreak (1933 film) (天明), 1933 Chinese silent film
Succession War (TV series) (天命), 2018 Hong Kong TV series